The Rotes Kliff Lighthouse on the island of Sylt, Germany, served as a sector light from 1913 to 1975. It is located on a cliffside north of the village of Kampen.

History 
The lighthouse was built between 1912 and 1913 as a sector light to warn ships of a sand bank in the approach to the Lister Tief nautical channel and to have a supplement to the main light at Kampen, 2.5 kilometres to the south. It became operational in 1913 and was electrified in 1936. Until its deactivation in 1975 it was maintained by the keepers of the Kampen lighthouse. When Rotes Kliff was extinguished, the main light at Kampen took over its part with a red section of light. Today the tower serves as a daymark without any lighting facility and is owned by the Kampen municipality who financed a restoration of the tower in 1993.

See also 

 List of lighthouses and lightvessels in Germany

References 

 

Lighthouses completed in 1913
Lighthouses in Schleswig-Holstein
Buildings and structures in Nordfriesland
1913 establishments in Germany
Sylt